Lee Ju-eun (born June 7, 1995), better known by the mononym Jueun, is a South Korean singer and actress known for her work as a former member of South Korean girl group DIA.

Early life and education
Lee Ju-eun was born on June 7, 1995 in Suwon, Gyeonggi Province, South Korea. She attended Korea Nazarene University where she majored in Practical Music.

Career

Pre-debut: K-pop Star 2
In 2012, Lee appeared in K-pop Star 2 as a contestant. She is a former Polaris Entertainment trainee where she trained with the members of LOONA before joining MBK Entertainment.

2017: Debut and solo appearances

In April 2017, MBK Entertainment announced its plans to add 2 new members, Jueun and Somyi to joined DIA. DIA eventually became a 9 member-group. Both are strong vocalists that will help strengthen the group's vocal line. Lee made her official debut as a member with the group's second studio album YOLO.

In 2018, Lee was featured in UNB's "Black Heart" as a back-dancer alongside former BEATWIN member Jungha, Lee Hangyul and S.I.S's Anne.

2018: Acting debut
Lee made her acting debut in the KBS Drama Special The Time Left Between Us as Park Se-hee.

Lee had a supporting role in the Netflix youth romance drama My First First Love as Chaeyeon's friend.

2019: V-1
In September 2019, Lee participated in the survival program show, V-1, to select the Vocal Queen among the various girl group members, where only the top 12 girl group members in votes would progress and perform on the show. She finished in tenth place.

2020-present: Lyrics writing
Throughout her career, besides contributing her vocal to DIA's songs, Jueun has explored into lyrics writing. She penned the lyrics for the song "To You (네게로(路))".

Discography

Song writing

Singles

Filmography

Television series

Television shows

References

External links 

1995 births
Living people
MBK Entertainment artists
South Korean female idols
South Korean women pop singers
21st-century South Korean singers
21st-century South Korean women singers